The Ohio general elections, 2010 were held on November 2, 2010 throughout Ohio. Primary elections took place on May 4, 2010.

Federal representatives

United States Senate

In the Democratic primary on May 4, 2010, current Lieutenant Governor Lee Fisher defeated current Secretary of State Jennifer Brunner. On November 2, Republican Rob Portman, who has served in two federal cabinet positions and as a member of the U. S. House of Representatives defeated Fisher as well as Eric W. Deaton of the Constitution Party and Dan La Botz of the Socialist Party.

Portman replaced Republican Senator George Voinovich, who retired from office after his second term expired.

United States House of Representatives

All of Ohio's eighteen seats in the United States House of Representatives were up for election in 2010.

State executive branch

Governor and Lieutenant Governor

Incumbent Democratic Governor Ted Strickland ran for reelection to a second term in office. His running mate was Yvette McGee Brown, the founding president of the Center for Child and Family Advocacy at Nationwide Children's Hospital, and former Judge of the Franklin County Court of Common Pleas.

John Kasich, former U.S. Representative and former Chair of the House Budget Committee, was the Republican nominee. His running mate was Ohio State Auditor Mary Taylor.

Ken Matesz was the Libertarian nominee. His running mate was Ann Leech.

Dennis Spisak was the Green nominee. His running mate was Anita Rios.

Kasich narrowly defeated Strickland with 49% of the vote.

Attorney General

In the Attorney General race, Democratic incumbent Richard Cordray was defeated by Republican Mike DeWine, a former two-term United States Senator from Ohio and member of the Senate Judiciary Committee as well as a former county prosecutor. DeWine would go on to defeat Cordray once again in the 2018 race for governor with running mate Jon Husted, the former Secretary of State.

Polling

Results

Secretary of State

Ohio's Secretary of State race featured a contested Republican primary on May 4, 2010 between Jon Husted, an Ohio State Senator and former Speaker of the Ohio House of Representatives, who defeated Sandra O'Brien, a former county auditor in Ashtabula County who secured the support of the Tea Party movement.  In the general election, Husted defeated Democrat Maryellen O'Shaughnessy, the Clerk of Franklin County Court of Common Pleas, and Charlie Earl, a Libertarian.

Incumbent Jennifer Brunner sought the Democratic nomination for United States Senator instead of running for re-election, but lost to incumbent Lt. Governor Lee Fisher.

Husted would later go on to run for Lieutenant Governor on Mike DeWine’s ticket which defeated Richard Cordray in the 2018 election.

Polling

Results

Treasurer

In the Treasurer race, Democratic incumbent Kevin Boyce was defeated by Republican Josh Mandel, a member of the Ohio State House of Representatives and a two tour veteran of the Iraq War, and Matthew Cantrell, a Libertarian candidate.

Polling

Results

Auditor

Ohio's Auditor race also featured a contested Republican primary on May 4, 2010, between Seth Morgan, a member of the Ohio House of Representatives, and Dave Yost, the Prosecuting Attorney for Delaware County, Ohio and former Delaware County Auditor.  Yost beat Democrat David A. Pepper, a Commissioner for the Hamilton County, Ohio Board of Commissioners, and L. Michael Howard, a Libertarian.

Republican incumbent Mary Taylor decided to run for Lieutenant Governor as John Kasich's running-mate, instead of running for re-election.

Polling

Results

State legislative branch

State Senate
The 17 odd-numbered districts out of 33 seats in the Ohio Senate were up for election in 2010.

State House of Representatives
All 99 seats in the Ohio House of Representatives were up for election in 2010.

State judicial branch
Three seats in the Supreme Court of Ohio are up for election, including the office of Chief Justice. The Supreme Court is a non-partisan office and will not appear on primary ballots. Although the Democratic and Republic parties customarily endorse candidates in the general election, those endorsements are not noted on the general election ballots either. Justices Judith Lanziger and Paul Peiffer are running for re-election. Justice Maureen O'Connor is running for Chief Justice. Judges for Ohio District Courts of Appeal and Ohio Courts of Common Pleas will also appear on the ballot.

Chief Justice

Associate Justice

Ballot initiatives
Two measures were approved in the May 4 election. No ballot measures were approved for the general election.

References

 
Ohio